Michael Hodge (February 24, 1947 – September 9, 2017) was an American actor and labor union executive known for his recurring roles on Law & Order and Law & Order: Special Victims Unit, where he often portrayed judges and detectives. Hodge was a longtime union activist and board member for the former Screen Actors Guild (SAG) and its successor, SAG-AFTRA, for more than sixteen years.

In 2001, Hodge was elected to the national board of directors of the Screen Actors Guild (SAG). He was first elected  President of SAG's New York City chapter in 2010 (SAG merged with AFTRA in 2012 to form the present union, SAG-AFTRA). Hodge was re-elected as the President of SAG-AFTRA New York local in August 2017, and served until his death a month later. He was the first SAG-AFTRA New York Local president to die in the office.

Biography
Mike Hodge was born in McComas, West Virginia, on February 24, 1947. He received his Bachelor of Arts from West Virginia University, where he also minored in theater. He worked for The Washington Post and then continued his theater studies at the DC Black Repertory Theater. He earned his memberships in the Actors' Equity Association, the Screen Actors Guild (SAG), and American Federation of Television and Radio Artists (AFTRA) while working in Washington D.C. He then moved to New York City.

Once in New York, Hodge's theater credits included four Broadway productions, including Fences and A Few Good Men. He became known for his work on the New York City-based show, Law & Order, where he held a recurring role as Judge Delano Burns throughout the 1990s and 2000s. His other television roles included Ed, Fringe and Law & Order: Special Victims Unit. His work included Striking Distance (1993), To Wong Foo, Thanks for Everything! Julie Newmar (1995)

In addition to acting, Hodge also narrated audiobooks, including works by Mitch Albom and Steve Harvey. He narration also included documentaries such as Aftershock: Beyond the Civil War (2006).

Mike Hodge first became active in the actors' labor union movement following the joint SAG and AFTRA commercial actors' strike in 2000. In 2001, he was elected to SAG's national board of directors. He was later elected President of SAG's New York City chapter in 2010. Hodge then served on SAG's G1 committee, which created the agreement to merge SAG and AFTRA in 2012.

Hodge also served as a member of the New York State AFL–CIO Executive Council and the City Labor Council, as well as a trustee of the Industry Advancement Cooperative Fund.

In August 2017, just one month before his death, Hodge won re-election as the President of SAG-AFTRA New York local. He had also recently finished filming Humor Me, an upcoming film by director Sam Hoffman.

Mike Hodge died unexpectedly on September 9, 2017, at the age of 70. He was survived by his mother, Roberta Hodge Johnson, and three siblings: Joseph Hodge, Karen Hodge Thomas, and Vicki Hodge Lynch. Following his death, SAG-AFTRA President Gabrielle Carteris paid tribute to Hodge, writing "Mike was an incredible advocate for SAG-AFTRA members since he first joined SAG’s New York board back in 2001. Through nearly 16 years of service, we came to know his wit, his generous nature and his insight. Mike had a deep love for the work we do as performers and enjoyed every character he brought to life on stage, television or film. We all relied on his kindness and his vibrant spirit to help guide us as we focused on the union and its members."

References

External links
 
 https://deadline.com/2017/10/sag-aftra-presidents-award-mike-hodge-1202185176/

1947 births
2017 deaths
American male film actors
American male stage actors
American male television actors
Audiobook narrators
Screen Actors Guild
SAG-AFTRA people
American trade union leaders
African-American male actors
West Virginia University alumni
Male actors from New York City
People from Washington, D.C.
People from Mercer County, West Virginia
20th-century African-American people
21st-century African-American people